The Gay Nineties Revue was an American variety series that aired live on ABC Television from August 11, 1948 to mid-1949 on Wednesdays at 8pm ET. The host was songwriter Joseph E. Howard, who was reportedly age 71 at the time he hosted the show.

Production background
Howard was a popular songwriter and singer, who later had a successful career capitalizing on the nostalgia many had for the "Gay 90's". The series was a hit on radio, before premiering on television.

Preservation status
At least one episode of this show survives, which can be viewed online at the Internet Archive.

See also
1948-49 United States network television schedule

References
Alex McNeil, Total Television, (New York: Penguin Books, fourth edition, 1980) 
Tim Brooks and Earle Marsh, The Complete Directory to Prime Time Network TV Shows, (New York: Ballantine Books, third edition, 1964)

External links
 
Kinescope of The Gay Nineties Revue at the Internet Archive
Video of the December 17, 1948, episode of The Gay Nineties Revue from YouTube

1948 American television series debuts
1949 American television series endings
1940s American variety television series
Black-and-white American television shows
American live television series
American Broadcasting Company original programming
English-language television shows